Brevis crassiductus is the only species in the monotypic moth genus Brevis of the family Erebidae. It is known from the mountains of south-central Sri Lanka. Both the genus and the species were first described by Michael Fibiger in 2008.

Adults have been found in October.

The wingspan is about 9 mm. The forewing is long, narrow and pointed at the apex. It is light grey, although it is blackish subterminally and at the costal ends of the antemedial and postmedial lines. There is a single, indistinct crossline. The subterminal line is weakly marked, while the terminal line is marked by black interveinal dots. The hindwing is light greyish but darker towards the termen. The fringes are whitish. There is an indistinct discal spot present. The underside of both wings is light greyish with an indistinct discal spot.

References

Micronoctuini
Noctuoidea genera
Moths described in 2008